The 1984 Torneo Descentralizado is the top category of Peruvian football (soccer), was played by 25 teams. The national champion was Sport Boys.

The national championship was divided into two tournaments, the Regional Tournament and the Descentralized Tournament. The winners of each tournament faced off in the final and received the berths for the Copa Libertadores 1985. The Regional Tournament divided the teams into four groups; Metropolitan, North, Central, and South. Teams that not qualified for Descentralised Tournament played on the Intermediary Division against teams from Second Division to gain promotion for next year. Regional Tournament grew to 30 teams for 1985.
If any of the Regional Groups winners finished on the top 6 of Descentralised Tournament, that team earned the right to playoff in the Liguilla against Descentralised runner-up for a Copa Libertadores place.

Teams

Regional tournament

Metropolitan zone

Northern zone

Central zone

Southern zone

Play-offs

Torneo Descentralizado

Liguilla

Liguilla playoff

Title

External links
RSSSF Peru 1984

1984
Peru
1984 in Peruvian football